Jacqueline Margarete Jones (born 10 February 1966) is a Welsh politician, barrister, and academic. She served as the Labour Party Member of the European Parliament (MEP) for Wales from 2019 to 2020. She taught law at Cardiff Law School, Cardiff University, and then at Bristol Law School, University of the West of England, where she was Professor of Feminist Legal Studies.

Background 
Jackie has lived in Cardiff and Pembrokeshire since 1985.

Jones has been researching and teaching law for over 20 years, first at Cardiff Law School, then at Bristol Law School, UWE. Her main teaching and research interests lie in the areas of gender, migration, asylum process, human trafficking, violence against women, all within a human rights perspective.

Jones was previously the Chair of the Wales Assembly of Women and President of the European Women Lawyers Association, and worked with various equalities organisations, including Welsh Women's Aid and the National Alliance of Women's Organisations.

Representing Wales 

Jones was the Labour MEP for Wales in the European Parliament from July 2019 to January 2020, when the UK withdrew from the European Union. Within the European Parliament, Jones was a member of the Legal Affairs Committee, the Women's Rights and Gender Equality Committee, and a substitute member of the Transport and Tourism Committee, as well as first Vice-Chair of the Delegation for relations with the United States. Jones also founded the Wales-EU Parliamentary Friendship Group which focused on strengthening Welsh-EU relations and providing a platform for Welsh citizens' rights and interests at the European level post-Brexit.

Jones stood for the Labour Party in Preseli Pembrokeshire at the 2021 Senedd election.

Since May 2022 Jones has been a county councillor on Cardiif Council for the Whitchurch & Tongwylais ward.

Selected works

References

1966 births
Living people
Labour Party (UK) MEPs
MEPs for Wales 2019–2020
21st-century women MEPs for Wales
Welsh barristers
Academics of Cardiff University
Academics of the University of the West of England, Bristol
Welsh legal scholars
Women legal scholars
Feminist studies scholars
People from Pembrokeshire